John Buford, Jr. (March 4, 1826 – December 16, 1863) was a United States Army cavalry officer. He fought for the Union as a brigadier general during the American Civil War. Buford is best known for having played a major role in the first day of the Battle of Gettysburg on July 1, 1863, by identifying, taking, and holding the "high ground" while in command of a division.

Buford graduated from West Point in 1848. He remained loyal to the United States when the Civil War broke out, despite having been born in the divided border state of Kentucky. During the war he fought against the Confederate Army of Northern Virginia as part of the Army of the Potomac. His first command was a cavalry brigade under Major General John Pope, and he distinguished himself at Second Bull Run in August 1862, where he was wounded, and also saw action at Antietam in September and Stoneman's Raid in spring 1863.

Buford's cavalry division played a crucial role in the Gettysburg Campaign that summer. Arriving at the small town of Gettysburg, Pennsylvania, on June 30, before the Confederate troops, Buford set up defensive positions. On the morning of July 1, Buford's division was attacked by a Confederate division under the command of Major General Henry Heth. His men held just long enough for Union reinforcements to arrive. After a massive three-day battle, the Union troops emerged victorious. Later, Buford rendered valuable service to the Army, both in the pursuit of Robert E. Lee after the Battle of Gettysburg, and in the Bristoe Campaign that autumn, but his health started to fail, possibly from typhoid. Just before his death at age 37, he received a personal message from President Abraham Lincoln, promoting him to major general of volunteers in recognition of his tactical skill and leadership displayed on the first day of Gettysburg.

Early years
Buford was born in Woodford County, Kentucky, but was raised in Rock Island, Illinois, from the age of eight. John, his father, was a prominent Democratic politician in Illinois and a political opponent of Abraham Lincoln. Buford was of English descent. His family had a long military tradition. John Jr.'s grandfather, Simeon Buford, served in the cavalry during the American Revolutionary War under Henry "Lighthorse" Lee, the father of Robert E. Lee. His great-uncle, Colonel Abraham Buford (of the Waxhaw Massacre), also served in a Virginia regiment. His half-brother, Napoleon Bonaparte Buford, would become a major general in the Union Army, while his cousin, Abraham Buford, would become a cavalry brigadier general in the Confederate States Army.
 
After attending Knox College in Galesburg, Illinois, for one year, Buford was accepted into the Class of 1848 at the United States Military Academy (West Point). Upperclassmen during Buford's time at West Point included Fitz-John Porter (Class of 1845), George B. McClellan (1846), Thomas J. Jackson (1846), George Pickett (1846), and two future commanders and friends, George Stoneman (1846) and Ambrose Burnside (1847). The Class of 1847 also included A.P. Hill and Henry Heth, two men Buford would face at Gettysburg on the morning of July 1, 1863.

Buford graduated 16th of 38 cadets and was commissioned a brevet second lieutenant in the 1st U.S. Dragoons, transferring the next year to the 2nd U.S. Dragoons. He served in Texas and against the Sioux, served on peacekeeping duty in Bleeding Kansas, and in the Utah War in 1858. He was stationed at Fort Crittenden, Utah, from 1859 to 1861. He studied the works of General John Watts de Peyster, who urged that the skirmish line become the new line of battle.

Civil War
Throughout 1860, Buford and his fellow soldiers had lived with talk of secession and the possibility of civil war until the Pony Express brought word that Fort Sumter had been fired upon in April 1861, confirming secession as fact. As was the case with many West Pointers, Buford had to choose between North and South. Based on his background, Buford had ample reason to join the Confederacy. He was a native Kentuckian, the son of a slave-owning father, and the husband of a woman whose relatives would fight for the South, as would a number of his own. On the other hand, Buford had been educated in the North and come to maturity within the Army. His two most influential professional role models, Colonels William S. Harney and Philip St. George Cooke, were Southerners who elected to remain with the Union and the U.S. Army. He loved his profession and his time on the frontier had snapped the ties that drew other Southerners home.

John Gibbon, a North Carolinian facing the same dilemma, recalled in a post-war memoir the evening that John Buford committed himself to the Union:

In November 1861, Buford was appointed Assistant Inspector General with the rank of major, and, in July 1862, after having served for several months in the defense of Washington, was raised to the rank of brigadier general of volunteers. In 1862, he was given his first position, under Major General John Pope, as commander of the II Corps Cavalry Brigade of the Union Army of Virginia, which fought with distinction at the Second Battle of Bull Run. Buford personally led a charge late in the battle, but was wounded in the knee by a spent bullet. The injury was painful, but not serious, although some Union newspapers reported that he had been killed. He returned to active service, and served as chief of cavalry to Major Generals George B. McClellan and Ambrose E. Burnside in the Army of the Potomac. Unfortunately, this assignment was nothing more than a staff position, and he chafed for a field command. In McClellan's Maryland Campaign, Buford was in the battles of South Mountain and Antietam, replacing Brigadier General George Stoneman on McClellan's staff. Under Major General Joseph Hooker in 1863, however, Buford was given the Reserve Brigade of regular cavalry in the 1st Division, Cavalry Corps of the Army of the Potomac. 

After the Battle of Chancellorsville, Major General Alfred Pleasonton was given command of the Cavalry Corps, although Hooker later agreed that Buford would have been the better choice. Buford first led his new division at the Battle of Brandy Station, which was virtually an all-cavalry engagement, and then again at the Battle of Upperville.

In the Gettysburg Campaign, Buford, who had been promoted to command of the 1st Division, is credited with selecting the field of battle at Gettysburg. On June 30, Buford's command rode into the small town of Gettysburg. Very soon, Buford realized that he was facing a superior force of rebels to his front and set about creating a defense against the Confederate advance. He was acutely aware of the tactical importance of holding the high ground south of Gettysburg, and so he did, beginning one of the most important battles in American military history. His skillful defensive troop dispositions, coupled with the bravery and tenacity of his dismounted men, allowed the I Corps, under Major General John F. Reynolds, time to come up in support and thus maintain a Union foothold in tactically important positions. Despite Lee's barrage attack of 140 cannons and a final infantry attack on the third day of the battle, the Union army won a strategic victory.  The importance of Buford's leadership and tactical foresight on July 1 cannot be overstated in its contribution to this victory. Afterward, Buford's troopers were sent by Pleasonton to Emmitsburg, Maryland, to resupply and refit, an ill-advised decision that uncovered the Union left flank.

In the Retreat from Gettysburg, Buford pursued the Confederates to Warrenton, Virginia, and was afterward engaged in many operations in central Virginia, rendering particularly valuable service in covering Major General George Meade's retrograde movement in the October 1863 Bristoe Campaign.

Death and legacy
By mid-December, it was obvious that Buford was sick, possibly from contracting typhoid, and he took respite at the Washington home of his good friend, General George Stoneman. On December 16, Stoneman initiated the proposal that Buford be promoted to major general, and President Abraham Lincoln assented, writing as follows: "I am informed that General Buford will not survive the day. It suggests itself to me that he will be made Major General for distinguished and meritorious service at the Battle of Gettysburg." Informed of the promotion, Buford inquired doubtfully, "Does he mean it?" When assured the promotion was genuine, he replied simply, "It is too late, now I wish I could live."

In the last hours, Buford was attended by his aide, Captain Myles Keogh, and by Edward, his black servant. Also present were Lieutenant Colonel A. J. Alexander and General Stoneman. His wife Pattie was traveling from Rock Island, Illinois, but would not arrive in time. Near the end, he became delirious and began admonishing Edward, but then, in a moment of clarity, called for the man and apologized: "Edward, I hear that I have been scolding you. I did not know what I was doing. You have been a faithful servant, Edward."

John Buford died at 2 p.m., December 16, 1863, while Myles Keogh held him in his arms. His final reported words were "Put guards on all the roads, and don't let the men run to the rear."

On December 20, memorial services were held at the New York Avenue Presbyterian Church, a church on the corner of H. Street and New York Avenue in Washington, D.C. President Lincoln was among the mourners. Buford's wife was unable to attend due to illness. The pallbearers included Generals Casey, Heintzelman, Sickles, Schofield, Hancock, Doubleday, and Warren. General Stoneman commanded the escort in a procession that included "Grey Eagle," Buford's old white horse that he rode at Gettysburg.

After the service, two of Buford's staff, Captains Keogh and Wadsworth, escorted his body to West Point, where it was buried alongside fellow Gettysburg hero Lieutenant Alonzo Cushing, who had died defending the "high ground" (Cemetery Ridge) that Buford had chosen. In 1865, a 25-foot obelisk style monument was erected over his grave, financed by members of his old division. The officers of his staff published a resolution that set forth the esteem in which he was held by those in his command:

{{Quote|... we, the staff officers of the late Major General John Buford, fully appreciating his merits as a gentleman, soldier, commander, and patriot, conceive his death to be an irreparable loss to the cavalry arm of the service. That we have been deprived of a friend and leader whose sole ambition was our success, and whose chief pleasure was in administering to the welfare, safety and happiness of the officers and men of his command.... That to his unwearied exertions in the many responsible positions which he has occupied, the service at large is indebted for much of its efficiency, and in his death the cavalry has lost firm friend and most ardent advocate. That we are called to mourn the loss of one who was ever to us as the kindest and tenderest father, and that our fondest desire and wish will ever be to perpetuate his memory and emulate his greatness."}}

In 1866, a military fort established on the Missouri-Yellowstone confluence in what is now North Dakota, was named Fort Buford after the general. The community of Buford, Wyoming, was renamed in the general's honor. It was sold at auction for $900,000 on April 5, 2012 to an unnamed Vietnamese by its owner, who had served in the U.S. military in 1968–1969.

In 1895, a bronze statue of Buford designed by artist James E. Kelly was dedicated on the Gettysburg Battlefield.

The M8 Armored Gun System, an American light tank canceled in 1996, is sometimes referred to as the "Buford" in his honor.

In popular media
Buford was portrayed by Sam Elliott in the 1993 film Gettysburg, based on Michael Shaara's novel The Killer Angels.

Buford is a character in the alternate history novel Gettysburg: A Novel of the Civil War, written by Newt Gingrich and William Forstchen.

See also

List of American Civil War generals (Union)

Notes

References
 Bielakowski, Alexander M. "John Buford." In Encyclopedia of the American Civil War: A Political, Social, and Military History, edited by David S. Heidler and Jeanne T. Heidler. New York: W. W. Norton & Company, 2000. .
 Eicher, David J. The Longest Night: A Military History of the Civil War. New York: Simon & Schuster, 2001. .
 Eicher, John H., and David J. Eicher. Civil War High Commands. Stanford, CA: Stanford University Press, 2001. .
 Hamersly, Lewis Randolph. Biographical Sketches of Distinguished Officers of the Army and Navy. New York: L. R. Hamersly, 1905. .
 Hard, Abner N. History of the Eighth Cavalry Regiment, Illinois Volunteers. Dayton, OH: Press of Morningside Bookshop, 1984. . First published 1868 by author.
 Langellier, John P., Kurt Hamilton Cox, and Brian C. Pohanka. Myles Keogh: The Life and Legend of an "Irish Dragoon" in the Seventh Cavalry. El Segundo, CA: Upton and Sons, 1991. .
 Longacre, Edward G. General John Buford: A Military Biography. Conshohocken, PA: Combined Publishing, 1995. .
 Moore, Frank. The Civil War In Song and Story, 1860–1865. P. F. Colliers, 1889. .
 Petruzzi, J. David. "John Buford: By the Book." America's Civil War Magazine, July 2005.
 Petruzzi, J. David. "Opening the Ball at Gettysburg: The Shot That Rang for Fifty Years." America's Civil War Magazine, July 2006.
 Petruzzi, J. David. "The Fleeting Fame of Alfred Pleasonton." America's Civil War Magazine, March 2005.
 Phipps, Michael, and John S. Peterson. The Devil's to Pay. Gettysburg, PA: Farnsworth Military Impressions, 1995. .
 Rodenbough, Theophilus. From Everglade to Cañon with the Second Dragoons: An Authentic Account of Service in Florida, Mexico, Virginia, and the Indian Country. New York: D. Von Nostrand, 1875. .
 Sanford, George B. Fighting Rebels and Redskins: Experiences in Army Life of Colonel George B. Sanford, 1861–1892. Norman: University of Oklahoma Press, 1969. .
 Proceedings of the Buford Memorial Association (New York, 1895)
 History of the Civil War in America'' (volume iii, p. 545)

External links
 

1826 births
1863 deaths
People from Woodford County, Kentucky
American people of English descent
Knox College (Illinois) alumni
People of Illinois in the American Civil War
People of Kentucky in the American Civil War
People from Rock Island, Illinois
Cavalry commanders
Union Army generals
United States Military Academy alumni
Burials at West Point Cemetery
Deaths from typhoid fever